Greg Hatza is an American jazz organist born in 1948 in Reading, Pennsylvania.

Music
Hatza started on piano at age five, and switched to organ at age fifteen. He played professionally from age sixteen, working for four years at Lenny Moore's club. He recorded two albums for Coral Records in the late 1960s with guitarist Eric Gale and drummer Grady Tate, then switched to electric keyboards in the 1970s as the organ's popularity waned. From 1974 to 1984, he studied tabla under Ustad Hamid Hossain. He later performed ragas on piano, in concert with Hamid, in the U.S., India, and Bangladesh. He returned to playing the organ in the 1990s after hearing Joey DeFrancesco, and recorded again as a leader with his ensemble, the Greg Hatza ORGANization. In 1996, he began to study Chinese classical music on the erhu, a two-stringed Chinese fiddle, under Shanghai instructor, Liang Shan Tang.

Martial arts

Hatza is an instructor of Ch'iang Shan Baguazhang (Pa Kua Chang), Xingyi Chuan, and Tai Chi Chuan at the Chinese Boxing Academy in Catonsville, Maryland. He has over forty years of martial arts experience, including Shotokan, Shaolin Kung Fu, Snow Tiger, Yang Style Tai Chi, Hsing-I, and Baguazhang (Pa Kua Chang).

He began his study of Bagua (Pa Kua Chang) in 1985 under Sifu Ken Fish. In 1990, he met Sifu Pak Bok Nam and has continued his studies in Baguazhang (Pa Kua Chang) under his tutelage. In 1999, he became a lineage disciple and licensed instructor of the Ch'iang Shan Pa Kua Chang system. He also teaches Tai chi. He has attended seminars with Yang Zhenduo to continue his refinement of the Yang Tai Chi Long Form and Straight Sword.

Discography
The Greg Hatza ORGANization Recordings
 The Wizardry of Greg Hatza (Coral, 1967) 
 Organized Jazz (Coral, 1968) 
 The Greg Hatza ORGANization (Palmetto, 1993)
 In My Pocket (Palmetto, 1996)
 Snake Eyes (Palmetto, 1998)
 To a New Place (I-Ching, 2001)
 Diggin' Up My Roots (Flip, 2016)

Moon August Recordings
 Just Another Gig (Bushido, 1979)
 Feelin' Free (Bushido, 1983)
 Potion (Syntax, 1989)
 Hard Times (Aim, 1992)
 Best of Moon August (Special Edition) (Ashley, 1999)

References

Scott Yanow, [ Greg Hatza] at Allmusic

American jazz organists
American male organists
Jazz musicians from Pennsylvania
Palmetto Records artists
Living people
21st-century organists
21st-century American male musicians
American male jazz musicians
Year of birth missing (living people)
21st-century American keyboardists